Playerhistory.com is an internet association football statistics database, founded in April 2002 by former footballer Håkon André Winther (born 15 September 1969 in Tromsø).

Maintained by a team of volunteers from all over the world, it is one of the largest websites of its kind. As of August 2009, when Football DataCo threatened legal action in a dispute over fixtures, the site contains more than 340,000 player profiles, 40,000 club details and more than 1,600,000 match results.

Playerhistory.com's material has been reproduced in media sources including Aftenposten and Bladet Tromsø.

References

External links 
List of archived Playerprofiles on Playerhistory.com at Wayback Machine.

Online person databases
Association football websites
Sport Internet forums
Internet properties established in 2002